Sophie Panonacle (born 16 December 1968) is a French politician representing La République En Marche!. She was elected to the French National Assembly on 18 June 2017, representing the department of Gironde.

References

1968 births
Living people
Deputies of the 15th National Assembly of the French Fifth Republic
Women members of the National Assembly (France)
La République En Marche! politicians
21st-century French women politicians
Politicians from Bordeaux
University of Bordeaux alumni

Deputies of the 16th National Assembly of the French Fifth Republic